Here We à Go Go Again! is Johnny Rivers's second official album, and like his first album, At the Whisky à Go Go, it was recorded live at the Whisky a Go Go in Los Angeles, California. The album was on the Billboard Charts for 23 weeks and reached #38 on December 12, 1964. The album spawned two hit singles: "Maybellene", #12 on the Billboard Hot 100, and "Midnight Special", #20 in 1965.

Track listing
 "Maybellene" (Chuck Berry) – 2:12
 "Dang Me" (Roger Miller) – 2:31
 "(Hello) Josephine" (Fats Domino, Dave Bartholomew) – 2:31
 "High Heel Sneakers" (Tommy Tucker) – 3:46
 "Can't Buy Me Love" (Lennon–McCartney) – 2:58
 "I've Got a Woman" (Ray Charles, Renald Richard) – 6:20
 "Baby What You Want Me to Do" (Jimmy Reed) – 5:42
 "Midnight Special" (traditional) – 2:28
 "Roll Over Beethoven" (Chuck Berry) – 2:53
 "Walk Myself on Home" (Joe Osborn, Eddie Rubin) – 2:34
 "Johnny B. Goode" (Chuck Berry) – 2:47
 "Whole Lotta Shakin' Goin' On" (Dave "Curlee" Williams, James Faye "Roy" Hall) – 3:08

Personnel

Musicians
 Johnny Rivers – vocals, guitar
 Joe Osborn – bass
 Eddie Rubin – drums

Technical
 Lou Adler – producer
 Wally Heider – remote engineer
 Bones Howe, Harold "Lanky" Linstrot – studio engineers 
 Studio Five – cover art

References
 

Johnny Rivers albums
Albums produced by Lou Adler
1964 live albums
Albums recorded at the Whisky a Go Go
Imperial Records live albums